Kartha or Karthavu, meaning "Lord" in the Malayalam language, is an aristocratic Nair title which traditionally meant, "One who does." It was conferred by the kings of Kerala to powerful Nair families, and as such, they enjoyed Raja (regional kings) or Naduvazhi (feudal chieftains and landlords) status.  Kartha chieftains were also bestowed with extraordinary rights and authorities by the erstwhile kings and they held a special status within the royal court. They used these privileges to own vast acres of land (Jenmi). History has it that some members of the Kartha community also used to work as Supreme Commanders in the royal armies of the king, while other Kartha families were renowned for their expertise in traditional Ayurveda medicine. Most Kartha families have their ancestral tutelary deity as the Hindu Goddess Bhadrakali, or the Goddess Durga. A few families also consider their ancestral deity as Vettakkorumakan, a Hindu entity worshiped in parts of North Kerala.

Social Role
The Karthas, as a community, ruled regional principalities and fiefdoms, served in the royal armies or worked as Tax Collectors for the kings. They also served as military commanders and feudal chieftains. The Kartha surname is still used today, although it is less prominent.

The title of Kartha ("Lord") appears to have been used as a titular name by some of the rulers of Madura. During the Madras Census of 1901, the title of Kartha was returned by the Balijas who claimed to be the descendants of the Nayak kings of Madura and Tanjore. The Tekkumkur and Vadakkumkur Rajas are said to have first conferred the title of Kartha on certain influential Nair families who were related by blood to the Rajas themselves. In social matters, the authority of the Kartha was supreme. Only on important issues were higher authorities called on to intercede.

Caste system 
Most Karthas belong to the Illam subdivision of the Nair caste, while a few were from the higher Kiryathil Nair subdivision.

See also
Caste system in Kerala
Eshmanan
Madampi (Nair title)
Mannadiar
Pillai
Nayanar (Nair subcaste)
Samanta Kshatriyas

References

Indian castes
Nair